Mayiladuthurai Junction (station code: MV) is a junction railway station serving the town of Mayiladuthurai in Mayiladuthurai District of Tamil Nadu, India.

The station is a part of the Tiruchirappalli railway division of the Southern Railway zone and connects the town to various parts of the state as well as the rest of the country. It is classified as an "A" category railway station in the Trichy railway division of the Southern Railway Zone. And now it is electrified and some trains runs with the help of electric locos. There are 2 routes originating from this junction and a single line touches in this junction they are: Mayiladuthurai to Tharangambadi (this line has only in gauge conversion work going on, but no works are started in last 25 years and now also), Mayiladuthurai to Thiruvarur (this line has electrified), and the Chennai to Tiruchirapalli line called main line also connected in Mayiladuthurai junction. There was another station which served eastern part of the town called Mayuram Town [station code: MVM]. Railways had done DPR's multiple times for Mayiladuthurai - Tharangambadi - Karaikal as current route is circular route which connects port with Salem Junction. Major revenue generation of Tiruchirapalli division comes from Freight services connecting Karaikal port with Salem and other parts of Tamilnadu. Govt is considering a new line in Mayiladuthurai - Karaikal as this is viable option for easier transport of goods. Also there is another proposal to connect Karaikal - Salem via Karaikal - Mayiladuthurai - Jayamkondam - Ariyalur - Perambalur - Salem

Location and layout
The railway station is located off the Sarathattai Street, Railway Cross Road south-west of Mayiladthurai.

Lines
The station is a focal point of the historic main line that connects Chennai with  via Cuddalore.

 Fully Electrified BG single line towards  via .
 Fully Electrified BG single line towards .

References

External links
 Southern Railways - Official Website
 

Trichy railway division
Railway stations in Mayiladuthurai district
Railway junction stations in Tamil Nadu
Mayiladuthurai district